Pathargama is a village in the Pathargama CD block in the Godda subdivision of the Godda district in the Indian state of Jharkhand.

Geography

Location                                            

Overview
Rajmahal coalfield is shown in the map. The entire area is overwhelmingly rural with only small pockets of urbanisation.

Note: The full screen map is interesting. All places marked on the map are linked and you can easily move on to another page of your choice. Enlarge the map to see what else is there – one gets railway links, many more road links and so on.

Demographics
According to the 2011 Census of India, Pathargama had a total population of 3,490, of which 1,818 (52%) were males and 1,672 (48%) were females. Population in the age range 0–6 years was 576. The total number of literate persons in Pathargama was 2,249 (77.18% of the population over 6 years).

Civic administration

Police station
Pathargama police station serves the Pathargama block.

CD block HQ
Headquarters of Pathargama CD block is at Pathargma village.

Education
SBSSPSJ College was established at Pathargama in 1980. It is affiliated with Sido Kanhu Murmu University.  It offers both honours and general courses in arts, science and commerce. and has coeducational facilities for classes XI and XII.
 
NG High School Pathargama is a Hindi-medium coeducational institution established in 1947. It has facilities for teaching from class IX to class XII.

Mahila College Pathargama is a Hindi-medium girls only institution established in 1989. It has facilities for teaching in classes XI and XII.

Government Girls High School Pathargama is a Hindi-medium girls only institution established in 1979. It has facilities for teaching in classes IX and X.

Kasturba Gandhi Balika Vidyalaya Pathargama is a Hindi-medium girls only school established in 2006. It has facilities for teaching from class VI to class XII.

References

Villages in Godda district